Anastasia Aleksandrovna Rudnaya (born 4 October 1990; née Tikhonova) is a Russian orienteering competitor. She was born in Leningrad.

As a junior, she won a bronze medal in the relay at the 2010 Junior World Championships in Aalborg.

She won a bronze medal in the mixed relay in the 2014 World Orienteering Championships in Asiago-Lavarone with the Russian team.

At the 2016 World Orienteering Championships in Strömstad she placed 13th in the long distance, and won a gold medal with the Russian relay team.

References

External links

1990 births
Living people
Russian orienteers
Female orienteers
Foot orienteers
World Orienteering Championships medalists
Sportspeople from Saint Petersburg
Junior World Orienteering Championships medalists